The Rock Connection is the twenty-seventh solo studio album by Cliff Richard. Released in November 1984 on EMI, the album is a part studio, part compilation album. It includes seven studio tracks recorded exclusively for the album, five tracks from the previous year's limited release album Rock 'n' Roll Silver, one previously released single, and one B-side from 1980.

The album reached number 43 on the UK Albums Chart. Two singles were released to promote the album. "Shooting from the Heart" was released in October 1984 and only reached number 51 on the UK Singles Chart. "Heart User" was released in January 1985 and only reached number 46. Most notably, although released almost two years prior, the hit single "She Means Nothing to Me" - a duet with Phil Everly of the Everly Brothers featuring Mark Knopfler - was included. Originally released in January 1983 and lifted from Phil Everly's self-titled solo album, "She Means Nothing to Me" made it to number 9 on the UK Singles Chart.

Critical reception
Reviewing for AllMusic, critic Bruce Eder wrote of the album "The resulting album was decidedly uneven -- much of it came off as a loud, lean, crisp mix of rock & roll and power pop, Richard's voice surrounded by (and often immersed beneath) in-your-face electric guitars and synthesizers."

Track listing
 "Heart User" (Terry Britten, Sue Shifrin) - 3:40
 "Willie and the Hand Jive" (Johnny Otis) - 3:52
 "Lovers and Friends" (Jon Sweet, Rod Trott) - 4:32
 "Never Be Anyone Else But You" (Baker Knight) - 4:03
 "La Gonave" (Cliff Richard) - 3:57
 "Over You" (Dave Cooke, Richard) - 3:11
 "Shooting from the Heart" (Roger Greenaway) - 3:09
 "Learning How to Rock and Roll" (Drew McCulloch) - 3:12
 "Lucille" (Albert Collins, Little Richard) - 3:37
 "Be-Bop-A-Lula" (Gene Vincent, Donald Graves, Bill "Sheriff Tex" Davis) - 3:15
 "Donna" (Ritchie Valens) - 4:21
 "Dynamite" (Ian Samwell) - 3:11
 "She Means Nothing to Me" with Phil Everly (John David) - 3:34
 "Makin' History" (Mark Griffiths, Graham Lyle) - 3:47
Additional tracks

Personnel

Tracks 1-3, 6-8
 Cliff Richard - producer, lead and backing vocals
 Keith Bessey - producer, engineer
 John Clark - guitars
 Mark Griffiths - bass guitar
 Stuart Tosh - drums
 Dave Cooke - keyboards
 Alan Park - keyboards

Tracks 4, 9-11, 14-19
 Cliff Richard - producer, lead vocals
 Thunder - producer
 Keith Bessey - engineer
 John Clark - guitars
 Martin Jenner - guitars
 Mark Griffiths - bass guitar
 Graham Jarvis - drums
 Dave Cooke - keyboards
 Alan Park - keyboards
 Stuart Calver - backing vocals
 Tony Rivers - backing vocals
 John Perry - backing vocals

Track 5
 Cliff Richard - producer, lead vocals, backing vocals
 Craig Pruess - producer, keyboards, programming
 Keith Bessey - engineer
 John Clark - guitars
 Mark Griffiths - bass guitar
 Graham Jarvis - drums

Track 12
 Alan Tarney - producer, bass guitar
 Ashley Howe - engineer
 Cliff Richard - lead and backing vocals
 Trevor Spencer - drums 
 Nick Glennie-Smith - synthesizer
 Michael Boddicker - synthesizer

Tracks 13 & 20
 Phil Everly/Cliff Richard - lead vocals, backing vocals
 Stuart Colman - producer, lead guitar, bass guitar, percussion
 Rod Houison - engineer, percussion
 Neil King - engineer
 John David - guitar
 Mark Knopfler - guitars
 Billy Bremmer - guitars
 Mickey Gee - rhythm guitar
 Pete Wingfield - piano
 Terry Williams - drums

Chart performance

Sales and certifications

References

External links

1984 albums
Cliff Richard albums
EMI Records albums
Albums produced by Alan Tarney
British rock-and-roll albums